Blair Scoullar (born 30 August 1979) is a New Zealand soccer player who plays as a midfielder.

International career
Scoullar made a solitary A-international appearance for New Zealand against Oman in Malaysia on 17 August 2000 at the Merdeka Tournament, a competition New Zealand went on to win.

References

External links
 
 

1979 births
Living people
New Zealand association footballers
New Zealand international footballers
Ballymena United F.C. players
Charleston Battery players
Expatriate association footballers in Northern Ireland
Expatriate soccer players in the United States
Canterbury United players
NIFL Premiership players
Association football midfielders